A Man Changes Skin is a 1960 Soviet drama film directed by Rafail Perelshtejn.

Plot
The construction of the Vakhsh Canal is underway which is one of the largest constructions of the first Five-Year Plan. Two Americans come by contract; a grizzled spy Colonel Bailey (Boris Vinogradov), who introduces himself as a harmless traveler by the name of Mr. Murray, only later to be caught red-handed and unmasked, and Mr. Clark (Sergei Kurilov), who arrives to the canal to "make money" and gradually becomes convinced that work and politics are not that different concepts. Not accepting socialism he is quite sympathetic to the enthusiasm of the Soviet people. Love for the Komsomol translator Maria Polozova (Izolda Izvitskaya) helps Clark to comprehend what is happening. In the middle of the construction is the engineer Urtabaev (Gurminch Zavkibekov), a strong, bright man, one of the first representatives of the Tajik intelligentsia. He is suspected of sabotage. However Urtabaev is not one of those who breaks under pressure - he proves his innocence concerning the sabotage and remains as one of the main construction authorities. On the festive opening day of the canal the last Basmachi gang is defeated in a fight which kills Komsomol leader Karim (Djakhon Sidmuradov).

Cast 
Sergei Kurilov as  Mr. Clark
Izolda Izvitskaya as Maria Polozova
Gurminch Zavkibekov as Saeed Urtabaev
Boris Vinogradov as Colonel Bailey / Mr. Murray
Asli Burkhanov as Hojiyarov
Sergei Golovanov as Morozov
Abdulkhair Kasymov as Fatkulla
Sergei Stolyarov as Sinitsin
Natalia Medvedeva as Valentina Sinitsina
Ninel Myshkova as Yelena Myshkova
Pavel Volkov as Savelich
Vladimir Yemelyanov as Komarenko
Djakhon Sidmuradov as Karim

Remake 
In 1979, director Boris Kimyagarov shot a film with the same title, where the main roles were played by Igor Kostolevsky, Boris Khmelnitsky, Larisa Udovichenko, Yuri Gorobets and Valentin Nikulin.

References

External links 

1960 drama films
1960 films
Soviet drama films
1960s Russian-language films
Soviet black-and-white films
Films based on Russian novels